U-129 may refer to one of the following German submarines:

 , a Type U 127 submarine laid down during the First World War but unfinished at the end of the war; broken up incomplete 1919–20
 During the First World War, Germany also had this submarine with a similar name:
 , a Type UB III submarine launched in 1918 and scuttled on 31 October 1918
 , a Type IXC submarine that served in the Second World War until taken out of service on 4 July 1944; scuttled on 18 August 1944; raised and stricken in 1946; broken up.

Submarines of Germany

pt:U-129
ru:U-129